Ivan Mykhailovych Dziuba (26 July 1931 – 22 February 2022) was a Ukrainian literary critic, social activist, dissident, Hero of Ukraine, academic of National Academy of Sciences of Ukraine, the second Minister of Culture of Ukraine (1992—1994), and head of the Committee for Shevchenko National Prize (1999–2001).

He was the Co-Chief of Editorial Board of the Encyclopaedia of Modern Ukraine.

He was the editor in chief of the magazine The Contemporary (Сучасність) and during the 1990s, a member of the editorial boards of scientific magazines "Київська старовина", "Слово і час", "Євроатлантика" and others.

Biography

Born into a peasant family, until 17 years of age Dziuba spoke only in Russian language.

In 1932, his family, fleeing from the famine, moved from their home village to the nearby workers' village Novotroyits'ke for a short time. Later, they moved to Olenevski Quarry (now Dokuchaievsk), where Dziuba finished secondary school № 1.

He graduated from Donetsk Pedagogical Institute, and pursued postgraduate studies in the Shevchenko Institute of Literature. His work was first published in 1959.

In the 1970s, he was subjected to political persecutions for the views he expressed in some publications.

In the end of 1965 Dziuba wrote his work Internationalism or Russification? (London, 1968, and "Motherland" magazine (ukr. "Вітчизна"), 1990, No. 5-7), dealing with the problems threatening national relations in socialist society, which he sent to the Communist authorities. A special commission of the Central Committee of the Communist Party of Ukraine inspected the text and decided that it was "lampoons on the Soviet reality, the national policy of the CPSU and the practice of communist construction in the USSR." Authorities accused Dziuba of undermining Soviet friendship of peoples, and fueling hatred between the Ukrainian and Russian peoples. In 1972 he was sentenced to 5 years in prison and 5 years in exile. Later he asked for pardon and after 18 months in prison Dziuba was pardoned and hired to work at the newspaper of Antonov Serial Production Plant.
After the change of political situation in the Soviet Union and transition to the independent Ukraine Dziuba became popular. He became co-founder of the People's Movement of Ukraine. From 1991 Dziuba was the head publisher of the Suchasnist Magazine.

Laureate of the Shevchenko Prize, O. Biletsky Prize, Antonovich Fund International Prize, Volodymyr Vernadsky Prize.

Dziuba died in Kyiv on 22 February 2022, at the age of 90. In December 2022 a street in Kyiv was named after him.

See also
 Andriy Skaba

References

Further reading
 Шевченківські лауреати. 1962—2001: Енциклопедичний довідник. — К., 2001. — С. 136—138.

Bibliography
 Дисидентський рух в Україні
 Мирослав Попович. Перевідкривач: до 70-річчя Івана Дзюби // Дзеркало тижня
 . Досвітній вогонь. У 1965 році з’явився всесвітньо відомий памфлет Івана Дзюби «Інтернаціоналізм чи русифікація?» // 
 Сюндюков Ігор. Тривожний ювілей. В українському домі відзначали 40-у річницю з часу оприлюднення знаменитої праці Івана Дзюби «Інтернаціоналізм чи русифікація?» // День 
 Довідник «Хто є хто в Україні». - К.: К.І.С.
 Письменницький довідник // Національна спілка письменників України

1931 births
2022 deaths
People from Mykolaivka, Donetsk Oblast
Ukrainian anti-Soviet resistance movement
Ukrainian politicians before 1991
Ukrainian dissidents
Ukrainian academicians
Ukrainian editors
Ukrainian writers
Ukrainian philosophers
Members of the National Academy of Sciences of Ukraine
Recipients of the title of Hero of Ukraine
Recipients of the Shevchenko National Prize
Culture ministers of Ukraine
Soviet dissidents
Donetsk National University alumni
Recipients of the Order of Prince Yaroslav the Wise, 5th class
People from Donetsk Oblast
Holodomor
Laureates of the State Prize of Ukraine in Science and Technology